The Great Scar Limestone Group is a lithostratigraphical term referring to a succession of generally fossiliferous rock strata which occur in the Pennines in northern England and in the Isle of Man within the Tournaisian and Visean stages of the Carboniferous Period.

It is contained within the Carboniferous Limestone Supergroup.

Basinal successions

Stainmore Trough 
The sequence in the Stainmore Trough is thus (youngest at top):
 Ashfell Sandstone (Arundian age)
 Breakyneck Scar Limestone (Arundian age)
 Red Hill Formation
 Brownber Formation (Chadian age)
 Scandal Beck Limestone (Chadian age)
 Coldbeck Limestone (Chadian age)

On the Alston Block corresponding to the North Pennines, the sequence contains the Melmerby Scar Limestone Formation.

Orton area 
In the Orton area, the sequence is:
 Knipe Scar Limestone
 Potts Beck Limestone
 Ashfell Limestone
 Ashfell Sandstone
 Breakyneck Scar Limestone
 Brownber Formation
 Scandal Beck Limestone
 Coldbeck Limestone

Kendal, Skelsmergh and Deepslack outliers 
In south Cumbria, the sequence is:
 Urswick Limestone
 Park Limestone
 Dalton Formation (time-equivalent of Breakyneck Scar Limestone in Stainmore Trough) (Arundian age)

Isle of Man 
On the Isle of Man, the following sequence is identified in the Castletown area:
 Knockcrushen Formation (wackestones, packstones and mudstones; of Holkerian age)
 Derbyhaven Formation (packstones and mudstones with some mudstones and siltstones; of Arundian age)
 Skillicore Member
 Sandwick Member
 Turkeyland Member

See also 

 List of fossiliferous stratigraphic units in England

References 

Geological groups of the United Kingdom
Geologic formations of England
Carboniferous System of Europe
Carboniferous England
Limestone formations
Geology of the Pennines
Geology of the Isle of Man